Friedrich Specht (6 May 1839, in Lauffen am Neckar – 12 June 1909, in Stuttgart), was a German painter and natural history illustrator. He held his first exhibition at the Stuttgart Art Academy. He provided illustrations of animals and landscapes for a large number of zoology and veterinary science publications, notably for the first edition of Brehms Tierleben (1864–69) conceived by Alfred Edmund Brehm, Brockhaus and Efron Encyclopedic Dictionary (1890—1907), Carl Vogt's Die Säugetiere in Wort und Bild (1883–89) and Richard Lydekker's Royal Natural History (1894–96). His brothers were the wood engraver Carl Gottlob Specht and the wildlife painter August Specht (1849–1923).

He was responsible for the lion's head on 's memorial to the fallen warriors of Stuttgart.

References

External links
 
 
 Friedrich Specht
 The Natural History of Animals (online)

19th-century German painters
19th-century German male artists
German male painters
20th-century German painters
20th-century German male artists
German sculptors
German male sculptors
German lithographers
1839 births
1909 deaths
20th-century sculptors
19th-century sculptors
20th-century German printmakers
20th-century lithographers